The Way Home is a Hallmark Channel original series. It premiered on January 15, 2023. On March 2, 2023, Hallmark Channel renewed the series for a second season.

Plot
It's a time travel drama about “More than 20 years prior, lifechanging events prompted Kat to move away from her small, Canadian farm town & she remains estranged from Del to this day,” the description continues. “At a crossroads in her life, Kat moves back with Alice to her family’s farm though the reunion isn’t what Kat envisioned. When Alice & Kat unwittingly discover the ability to travel between the past & present, Mother & Daughter are determined to unearth the truth around the earlier tragedies as they try to change the course of events? Kat’s childhood best friend named Elliot is there for them in both eras as they navigate their journeys across time, helping the three women; Katherine, Delilah, & Alice find their way back to each other.”

Synopsis 
The series follows three generations of Landry women who embark on a journey to find their way back to each other while learning important lessons about their family’s past.
Alice falls into the pond on the family property & emerges to discover she's back in the 1990s & unwittingly becomes best friends with the teenage version of her Mom  named Kat. She discovers the time when her Mom and her family were happy before the tragedies that broke the family apart & drove Kat to run away & get married, resulting in her birth. Then she starts wondering if she might be able to prevent that tragedy & save her Mother named Katherine & Grandmother named Delilah from twenty years of grief. The only confidante she has is Elliot who was friend-zoned by Katherine then & now is her high school science  teacher in the present day. But even as Elliot continues to carry a torch for Kat, he doesn't believe in changing history or if it's even possible.

Cast and characters

Main
 Chyler Leigh as Katherine "Kat" Landry Dhawan, Del's daughter and Alice's mother
 Alex Hook as Teenage Kat Landry
 Evan Williams as Elliot Augustine, a close friend of the Landry family
 David Webster as Teenage Elliot Augustine
 Sadie Laflamme-Snow as Alice Dhawan, a 15-year-old who discovers she can time travel.
 Andie MacDowell as Delilah "Del" Landry, Kat's mother

Recurring
 Jefferson Brown as Colton Landry, Del's husband and Kat and Jacob's father, who is deceased 
 Remy Smith as Jacob Landry, Colton and Del's son and Kat's brother, who has been missing since 1999 and is presumed dead
 Al Mukadam as Brayden "Brady" Dhawan, Kat's ex-husband and Alice's father
 Siddharth Sharma as Teenage Brady 
 Nigel Whitmey as Byron Groff, the owner of the Port Haven newspaper 
 Samora Smallwood as Monica Hill, a frenemy of Kat's in high school and a resident of Port Haven who runs a diner
Monique Jasmine Paul as Teen Monica 
 Marnie McPhail-Diamond as Rita Richards, a close friend of Del's
 Ali Prijono as Zoey, a student at Alice's new high school.
 Kateam O'Connor as Spencer Hill, a student at Alice's new high school.
Peyson Rock as Danny Sawyer, Jacob's best friend in 1999
Baeyen Hoffman as young Danny Sawyer
Kerry James as Nick,  He's engaged to his fiancée, Claire
Sam Braun as Teen Nick, Alice's boyfriend in 1999
 Alex Mallari Jr. as Dr. Andy Stafford, a veterinarian in Port Haven who Monica introduces to Kat
 Laura de Carteret as Joyce, Nick's mother and co-owner, with Jude, of the Roxy movie theatre.
 Megan Fahlenbock as Jude, Nick's mother and Joyce's partner.

Episodes

References

External links
 

English-language television shows
Hallmark Channel original programming
2020s Canadian drama television series
2020s American drama television series
2023 American television series debuts
 2023 Canadian television series debuts